Pierre Fridaricus was a Roman Catholic prelate who served as Bishop of Nisyros, one of the Greek islands.

Biography
Pierre Fridaricus served as Bishop of Nisyros in the late 1400s. 

While bishop, he was the principal consecrator of George Brann (bishop), Bishop of Dromore (1483); Abel de Saint-Brieuc, Auxiliary Bishop of Reims (1483); Heinrich Kratz, Auxiliary Bishop of Naumburg (1484); Michael Hildebrand, Archbishop of Riga (1484); and Jean Orient, Bishop of Terralba (1485). He was also the principal co-consecrator of John Sherwood, Bishop of Durham (1484); George Browne, Bishop of Dunkeld (1484); and Bishop Jean (1484).

References 

15th-century Roman Catholic bishops in the Republic of Venice
Bishops appointed by Pope Sixtus IV